Salih Uglla Peshteri was an Albanian performer of epic poetry (Albanian: lahutar or rapsod) from Ugao, in Pešter a sparsely populated region near Sjenica, modern day Sandžak.

Life 
According to Robert Elsie, Salih Uglla Peshteri was born in 1866. According to Albanian sources he was a Catholic Albanian from the tribe of Kelmendi while Parry believes he was a Muslim Albanian from Shkodër. Up to the age of 30, he sang only in Albanian but began singing in Bosnian after he married a Bosnian woman. Uglla was able to sing in both languages for hours making him a popular lahutar. In 1934 he sang the "Song of Baghdad" in Novi Pazar and it is believed that this song was taught to him by another bard.

References

Citations

Bibliography 

1849 births
Year of birth uncertain
1945 deaths
People from Sjenica
Date of birth missing
Date of death missing
19th-century Albanian male singers
20th-century Albanian male singers